is a city located in Saitama Prefecture, Japan. , the city had an estimated population of 112,211 in 53,051 households and a population density of 5700 persons per km².

Geography
Located in southwestern Saitama Prefecture, Fujimi is in the middle of the Kantō plain with an average altitude of 8 to 21 meters above sea level. It is approximately 10 kilometers from the prefectural capital at Saitama and 30 kilometers from downtown Tokyo.The northeastern half of the city area is a lowland with the Arakawa and Shingashi Rivers and the southwestern half part of the Musashino Plateau. The urban area is primarily in the southwest. The city has approximate dimensions of 7.0 kilometers from east-to-west and 6.8 kilometers from north-to-south.

Surrounding municipalities
 Saitama Prefecture
 Kawagoe
 Fujimino
 Saitama
 Shiki
 Miyoshi

Climate
Fujimi has a Humid subtropical climate (Köppen Cfa) characterized by warm summers and cool winters with light to no snowfall.  The average annual temperature in Fujimi is 14.9 °C. The average annual rainfall is 1426 mm with September as the wettest month. The temperatures are highest on average in August, at around 26.7 °C, and lowest in January, at around 4.2 °C.

Demographics
Per Japanese census data, the population of Fujimi expanded rapidly in the late 20th century and has grown at a slower rate in the 21st.

History
The area of modern Fujimi is part of ancient Musashi Province. The villages of Tsuruse and Nanbata created within Iruma District, Saitama with the establishment of the modern municipalities system on April 1, 1889. The village of Fujimi was created on September 30, 1956 by the merger of the villages of Tsuruse and Nanbata with the village of Mizutani from Kitaadachi District. Large scale public housing projects and new town developments in the 1960s and 1970s led to a rapid increase in population, and Fujimi attained town status on April 1, 1964 and city status on April 10, 1972.

Government
Fujimi has a mayor-council form of government with a directly elected mayor and a unicameral city council of 21members. Fujimi contributes one member to the Saitama Prefectural Assembly. In terms of national politics, the city is part of Saitama 7th district of the lower house of the Diet of Japan.

Elections
 2008 Fujimi mayoral election

Economy
Due to this location, Fujimi is primarily a bedroom community with over 30% of its population commuting to the Tokyo metropolis for work.

Education
Fujimi has 11 public elementary schools and six public middle schools operated by the city government, and one public high school operated by the Saitama Prefectural Board of Education. In addition the prefecture also operates one special education school for the handicapped.

Transportation

Railway
 Tōbu Railway - Tōbu Tōjō Line
 -  -

Highway

Sister city relations
  Šabac, Serbia

Local attractions
site of Nambada Castle
Mizuko Shell Midden archaeological site

Noted people from Fujimi
Ryunosuke Kamiki, actor
Yumi Matsuzawa, musician 
Ryota Imanari, professional baseball player

References

External links

Official Website 

 
Cities in Saitama Prefecture